The Journal of High Technology Law is one of five law journals at Suffolk University Law School publishing articles, blogs, and book reviews covering subjects related to technology law. It was established in 1998 and became Suffolk's fourth honor board law journal in 2001. In Washington and Lee University's 2017 rankings of law journals with the highest impact factor, the journal was ranked 7th among law journals specializing in Science, Technology and Computing, 8th among law journals specializing in Intellectual Property, and was ranked 148th among all 1,549 United States law journals.

References

External links

American law journals
Suffolk University Law School
Publications established in 1998
English-language journals
Biannual journals